Biržai (known also by several alternative names) is a town in northern Lithuania.  Biržai is famous for its reconstructed Biržai Castle manor, and the whole region is renowned for its many traditional-recipe beer breweries.

Names
The name of the town is of Lithuanian origin and is spelled in different forms in other languages: Birsen (German), Birże (Polish), Birzhai (Биржай, Russian - pre-1917 Биржи), and בירז/Birz or Birzh (Yiddish)  and simplified to Birzai in English.

History

The town's first written mention dates to 1455. The construction of Biržai Castle began in 1586, and the town was granted Magdeburg Rights in 1589. It is the oldest surviving artificial lake in Lithuania. The town's history is closely associated with the Radziwiłł family (Lithuanian: Radvila). Jerzy Radziwiłł was the first noble to settle in the town. Later, after his daughter, Barbara Radziwiłł married the Grand Duke of Lithuania and King of Poland Sigismund II Augustus in 1547, the power and influence of the family grew immensely. The Radvila family established a Protestant church and school, and the town became a cultural center of the Protestant Reformation in Lithuania.

The local community of Lithuanian Jews, which settled in the Duchy of Biržai at the end of the 16th century, was influential, establishing an interest-free loan society, two major flour mills, and an international linen export business. The Islamic Lipka Tatars performed military, police, and postal duties for the Radziwill family.

During the Wars with Sweden, Biržai Castle was an important point of defence. In 1625, Gustavus Adolphus, king of Sweden, attacked the castle with 8,000 soldiers and it was forced to surrender. The castle was left in ruins and was rebuilt, only to be burnt in 1655. In 1662–1669, it was rebuilt again in Renaissance style.  On 9 March 1701, August II the Strong and Peter I of Russia (Peter the Great) signed a pact in the castle to unite their forces against Sweden. However, in 1704 the castle was completely destroyed and was left in ruins until its restoration in the 1990s.

The town's population suffered greatly due to wars and religious conflicts between the Protestants and Catholics. In the late 18th century, Biržai lost its town rights. The Radziwiłłs lost their wealth and influence, and Biržai was sold to the Tyszkiewicz family to cover debts in 1811. In 1849–1862, the Tyszkiewicz family built a neoclassic Astravas Manor palace across the lake from the site of the original castle.

In 1869 the town had about 2,600 residents. Thirty years later the population had grown to 4,400.

During World War II, the entire Jewish population of Biržai was annihilated. 15 Jews were shot to death by German soldiers at the Biržai Jewish cemetery in July 1941. On 8 August 1941, Gestapo and Lithuanian collaborators murdered the entire Jewish population of the town, some 2,400 people, by shooting them to death at a mass grave in a forest grove  outside the town.
The town was almost completely burned down during the war. Oldtown was destroyed.

In 1968 the population reached 10,000. Currently there are 15,000 people living in Biržai.

Architecture

After the unrest and conflicts have settled down, from the 19th-century wooden residential houses prevailed and with an ongoing industrial revolution at the time, asbestos or metal-sheet roofing was common. With the majority of buildings being wooden, masonry buildings eventually emerged to battle cold winters and hot summers. In the early 20th century, central roads were cobblestone. During the World Wars, the old town was destroyed and the majority of wooden buildings in the main street burned down.

During the Soviet rule, the town's population grew twice its previous size. To accommodate the growth, around 60 new apartment buildings were constructed and main streets asphalted. There was also an increase in new houses being built from bricks instead of wood, and the majority of them were left not plastered.

With the help of European Union's Development Assistance grants, the town was able to regain a unique style - since 2014 numerous apartment building renovations were carried out with more planned, the road infrastructure is being improved and some new constructions built to attract visitors and to restore the historic appearance.

Geography

The northern part of the town, along with Lake Širvėna, lies within Biržai Regional Park. About 9,000 sinkholes have been identified in the park, formed abruptly after gypsum in the soil has been dissolved by underground water.  Some of these holes are dry, while others have become small ponds or lakes filled with water from the many underground rivers and streams. New holes appear annually. According to local legend, the 20-meter-deep sinkhole known as Karves ola (Cow's Cave) was discovered by a farmer after his cow disappeared. A tunnel at its bottom leads to a cave and underground lake.

Climate

Notable people 

 Jurgis Bielinis, publicist and one of the main organizers of illegal book-smuggling (knygnešiai) at the time of the Lithuanian press ban
 Kazys Binkis, poet, playwright
 Romualdas Brazauskas, basketball referee
 Bernardas Brazdžionis, poet
 Vladas Garastas, basketball coach
 Petras Kalpokas, painter
 Pinchas HaKohen Lintup (1851–1924), rabbi of Hasidic community 
 Mantas Kvedaravičius, film maker and anthropologist
 Jonas Mekas, film maker
 Alfonsas Petrulis, signatory of the Act of Independence of Lithuania
 Jerzy Radziwiłł, Great Hetman of Lithuania
 Žydrūnas Savickas, strongman
 Jokūbas Šernas, signatory of the Act of Independence of Lithuania
 Austra Skujytė, olympic silver medal winner
 Janusz Skumin Tyszkiewicz
 Balys Sruoga, poet, playwright, critic, and literary theorist
 Elchonon Wasserman, Lithuanian rabbi, disciple of Chofetz Chaim
 Vytautas Laisonas, Lithuanian national painter
 Vidmantas Jažauskas, Lithuanian painter

Sport
 FK Širvėna Biržai (football club);
 Biržai Stadium (The current capacity of the stadium is 1,000 seats.);
 KK Biržai (basketball club).

External links
 Virtual Tour of Biržai

References

 Official website of Biržai district municipality
  Historical map of Lithuania by Jean Baptiste Bourguignon Anville with Birze

Footnotes

 
Cities in Lithuania
Cities in Panevėžys County
Municipalities administrative centres of Lithuania
Trakai Voivodeship
Ponevezhsky Uyezd
Shtetls
Holocaust locations in Lithuania
Biržai District Municipality